The 1977 World Cup took place December 8–11 at the Wack Wack Golf and Country Club in Manila, Philippines. It was the 25th World Cup event. The tournament was a 72-hole stroke play team event with 50 teams. The Mexico team of Ernesto Perez Acosta and Victor Regalado did not arrive on time to start and were replaced by a Filipino amateur team of Tommy Manotoc and Emilio Tuazon. Each team consisted of two players from a country. The combined score of each team determined the team results. The Spanish team of Seve Ballesteros and Antonio Garrido successfully defended the title Spain won in 1976 and won by two strokes over the Philippines team of Ben Arda and Rudy Lavares. The individual competition for The International Trophy, was won by Gary Player of South Africa, three strokes ahead of Lavares and Hubert Green, United States.

Teams 

(a) denotes amateur

Source:

Scores 
Team

International Trophy

Sources:

References

World Cup (men's golf)
Golf tournaments in the Philippines
Sports in Metro Manila
World Cup golf
World Cup golf